Uncial 0209 (in the Gregory-Aland numbering), is a Greek uncial manuscript of the New Testament, dated palaeographically to the 7th-century.

Description 
The codex contains a small parts of the Romans 14:9-23; 16:25-27; 15:1-2; 2 Corinthians 1:1-15; 4:4-13; 6:11-7:2; 9:2-10:17; 2 Peter 1:1-2:3, on 8 parchment leaves (27 cm by 19 cm).

The text is written in two columns per page, 29-32 lines per page, in uncial letters. It is a palimpsest, the upper text contains liturgical in Greek written by minuscule hand, it belongs to Lectionary 1611.

The text-type of this codex is mixed with a strong Byzantine element. Aland placed it in Category III.

The text of Romans 16:25-27 is following after Romans 14:23, as in Codex Angelicus, Codex Athous Lavrensis, Minuscule 181, 326, 330, 451, 460, 614, 1241, 1877, 1881, 1984, 1985, 2492, 2495.

In 2 Corinthians 1:10 it reads τηλικουτου θανατου, along with א, A, B, C, Dgr, Ggr, K, P, Ψ, 0121a, 0150, 0243, 33, 81, 88, 104, 181, 326, 330, 436, 451, 614, 1241, 1739, 1877, 1881, 1962, 1984, 1985, 2127, 2492, 2495, Byz.

Currently it is dated by the INTF to the 7th century.

The manuscript was added to the list of the New Testament manuscripts by Kurt Aland in 1953.

The codex is currently housed at the University of Michigan Library (Ms. 8, ff. 96, 106–112) in Ann Arbor.

See also 

 List of New Testament uncials
 Textual criticism

References

Further reading 

 K. W. Clark, A Descriptive Catalogue of Greek New Testament Manuscripts in America, (Chicago, 1937), p. 277. 
 J. H. Greenlee, Nine Uncial Palimpsests of the New Testament, S & D XXXIX (Salt Lake City, 1968).

External links 
 Uncial 0209 at the CSNTM
 Manuscript Gregory-Aland 0209 at the Internet Archive

Greek New Testament uncials
7th-century biblical manuscripts
Palimpsests